Sophora tomentosa, also known as necklacepod, yellow necklacepod, and occasionally as silver bush, is a pantropical shrub or small tree in the family Fabaceae. It commonly ranges in height from 4 to 10 feet and often occurs in coastal conditions and near wetlands. The common name Necklacepod is derived from the characteristic string of seed pods that develop after its yellow flowers germinate into seeds.

Necklacepod is a nectar plant for bees, butterflies, and in parts of the Americas hummingbirds as well. It is suggested for use by native plant enthusiasts in Florida as a good landscape plant for xeriscaping but it only naturally occurs in coastal counties in the central and southern part of the state, while closely related varieties occur in Texas, and the Caribbean. The variety of Necklacepod growing in Australia is considered an endangered species in some areas due to the clearing of coastal habitat and displacement by invasive species.

In Sri Lanka, the plant is known as moodu murunga. The inedible pod has some similarities to the murunga (drumstick) pod. It has been used to make fish poisons, insect and spider repellents etc., esp in Africa.

References

External links

 Sophora tomentosa pictures from hear.org

tomentosa
Plants described in 1753
Taxa named by Carl Linnaeus
Butterfly food plants
Endangered flora of Australia
Flora of Florida
Pantropical flora